Vesperus nigellus is a species of beetle in the Vesperidae family that is endemic to Balearic Islands.

References

Vesperidae
Beetles described in 1963
Endemic fauna of the Balearic Islands
Beetles of Europe